Sapporo Hachimangū (札幌八幡宮, Sapporo Hachimangū) is a Shinto shrine located in Sapporo, Hokkaido. It is a Hachiman shrine, dedicated to the kami Hachiman. It was established in 1977. Kami enshrined here include Tenjin (天満大神, Sugawara no Michizane), Akibadai Gongen (秋葉大権現), Ume no Miya Okami (梅の宮大神), and Kotohira no Okami (金刀比羅大神).

See also
Hachiman shrine
List of Shinto shrines in Hokkaidō

External links
Official website

Shinto shrines in Hokkaido
1977 establishments in Japan
Hachiman shrines